Fumiaki Kobayashi may refer to:

, Japanese pole vaulter
, Japanese politician